Uryū may refer to:

Places
Uryū District, Hokkaidō, a district in Hokkaidō, Japan
Uryū, Hokkaidō, a town

People with the given name
, a social worker in the Meiji period
, an admiral of the Imperial Japanese Navy

Fictional characters
, in the manga GetBackers
, in the manga Bleach

Japanese masculine given names